was a Japanese politician who served as Japan's Minister of Labor from 1991 until 1992.

Kondo, who was from Yamagata Prefecture, began his career as an employee of the Japanese Ministry of Finance. Kondo, a member of the Liberal Democratic Party, served as a member of the House of Representatives of Japan for nine terms from 1972 until 1996. He also served as chief of the now defunct Economic Planning Agency during his career as a lawmaker.

Kondo was appointed as labor minister within the administration of Prime Minister Kiichi Miyazawa from 1991 until 1992. He retired from active politics after a failed re-election bid in the 1996 general election.

Tetsuo Kondo died in Tokyo of pancreatic cancer on March 4, 2010, at the age of 80.

References

External links
 Personal History of Tetsuo Kondo, Member of the House of Representatives, Japan, Carnegie Mellon University Library

|-

1929 births
2010 deaths
Ministers of Labour of Japan
Members of the House of Representatives (Japan)
People from Yamagata Prefecture
Liberal Democratic Party (Japan) politicians